Meleshko is a Ukrainian-language surname. Literally, it is a diminutive derived from the given name  Мелёха/Мелеха (Melyokha/Melekha), which is a diminutive form  of the given name Yemelyan  or Meletiy/Meletius.
Dmitry Meleshko
Vasyl Meleshko
Roman Meleshko

See also

References

Ukrainian-language surnames